The P.43 was a proposed Italian heavy tank ( P=pesante, heavy ) designed in April 1943, it never left the planning stage and was developed parallel to the P26/40 tank.

Features 
The P43 or P 30/43 was developed by FIAT and Ansaldo simultaneously with the P26/40, of which it was supposed to be a heavier version. The vehicle was planned to have weighed 30 tons and would have mounted an engine of 420 hp. The gun was the same as the P.26 - the 75/34 mm cannon. While it was still in the design phase, it was proposed to use the 90/42 gun derived from anti-aircraft Cannone da 90/53, or the 105/25 mm cannon mounted on the Semovente da 105/25 instead.

P43 bis

A photograph of P43 as a wooden model exists (probably on a smaller scale) along with other models of P40 and P43 bis, 30 tons with cannon that looks like it could be a lighter version of the 90/53 piece. In the same picture, there is a model of a German Panther version slightly smaller and with what is likely a 90/53 cannon, that the Germanic part stigmatized as a plagiarism of the Panther tank that Italy had received blueprints for the production in license. It seems that this model has received the abbreviation P43 bis (perhaps for the observed inability to get quickly to the production of the P43 with a piece of 90 mm).

This overlap of studies can be originated either by news from the Russian front on the new Soviet medium tank T-34/85 of 32 tons and with 85 mm cannon derived from the anti-aircraft gun either the availability of data and drawings of the German Panther.

According to various publications the engines should have been these:  
 P26/40 diesel engine of 330 Hp then replaced in production for one to 420 hp gasoline. 
 P30/43 or P43 420/430 hp V12 diesel engine. 
 P.43 bis (gun 90/42 mm) the same engine 420/430 hp. 
 P.35/43 or second P43 bis (Panther reduction) of 35 tons with gun 90/53 or 90/42 mm and 470/480 HP engine copied from the engine of the Russian T-34.

Frontal protection of 80/100 mm would guarantee equal performance with the machines designed by other nations, such as the Russian 1944 IS-2 of 46 tons (which was 122 mm), the Tiger I of 57 tons and higher than the Panther of 45 tons, which was 80 mm.

See also 
 P26/40

Notes

Bibliography 
 Cesare Falessi, Benedetto Pafi, Veicoli da combattimento dell'Esercito Italiano dal 1939 al 1945, Intyrama books, 1976.
 Ralph A. Riccio, Nicola Pignato, Marcello Calzolari; Carri Armati e Veicoli da Combattimento Italiani della Seconda Guerra Mondiale, 2010

External links
 http://www.soldatinionline.it/Articoli/Eserciti-Uniformi/Un-carro-moderno-per-il-Regio-Esercito-il-P.40.html

World War II tanks of Italy
Fiat armored vehicles
Gio. Ansaldo & C. armored vehicles
World War II heavy tanks